Terror Tomb (later renamed Forbidden Tomb) was a dark ride attraction at Chessington World of Adventures in southwest London, England, themed as an adventure inside a haunted tomb. The ride opened in 1994 along with the Forbidden Kingdom area. All music was composed by Graham Smart, including the hard rock song featured in the ride's finale.

Ride information
The ride was created as a replacement for the 5th Dimension, occupying the same infrastructure and show building. The ride show featured animatronics and practical theatrical effects with an Ancient Egyptian theme, mixing dark humour with ghost train horror. The story followed a corrupt tour guide named Abdab plotting to steal treasure from within the tomb, before he is captured by mummies and sacrificed in a dramatic hard rock concert finale.

Terror Tomb operated for seven years before closing in 2001, as the horror content was considered at odds with Chessington new family target audience. A lot of the ride's sets were recycled for the replacement attraction Tomb Blaster, with the exception of the animatronics.

See also
Chessington World of Adventures Resort
The 5th Dimension
Tomb Blaster

References

External links

Restored on-ride recording from 1994
Terror Tomb online documentary with its 1994 designers

Dark rides
1994 establishments in England
2001 disestablishments in England
Chessington World of Adventures past rides